Mariya Yankova Neykova (1945–2002) was a Bulgarian singer and composer.

Biography 
Mariya Neykova was born on December 21, 1946, in Plovdiv, Bulgaria. Neikova graduated from the Academy of Music and Arts in Plovdiv. Known as the "Girl with the Guitar," she was in love with her native Plovdiv. Her career started in 1968. From 1969 to 1973, she was a soloist in the Sofia Symphonic Orchestra. Over the years, Mariya composed more than 100 songs. One of her songs,  "Светът е за двама", is very popular in Bulgaria.

After surviving a plane crash, a terrorist attack and eight operations, she died suddenly at her home in Sofia on August 1, 2002.  She outlived her husband Niki by only a year.

Albums 
 Пролетна любов (The Green Window) (1972)
 Пролетна любов (Spring Love) (1975)
 Заръка (behest) (1975)
 За себе си и за другите (For Myself and for the Others) (1990)
 Mariya Neykova Golden Hits

Awards 
First place in Golden Orpheus (1969) for the song "Закъснели срещи"(Late dates)
First place in Melody of the year (Bulgaria, 1972) for the song "Добър вечер, лека нощ"(Good Evening, Good Night)

References

1945 births
2002 deaths
Bulgarian pop singers
20th-century Bulgarian women singers
Musicians from Plovdiv